This is a list of current airlines of Germany.

Scheduled airlines

Charter airlines

Cargo airlines

See also
 Airline codes
 List of airports in Germany
 List of defunct airlines of Germany
 List of airlines of Europe

References

Germany
Airlines
Airlines
Germany